Johan Henrik Schreiner (16 November 1933–7 November 2022) was a Norwegian historian of Ancient Greek history, in particular the Greek polis and the Battle of Marathon.

Selected bibliography
Aristotle and Pericles: a study in historiography, 1968
Antikkens historie, 1985
To gode keisere? Roma under Traianus og Hadrianus, 1996, with Knut Ødegård
Hellanikos, Thukydides and the era of Kimon, 1997
Two battles and two bills: Marathon and the Athenian fleet, 2004

References

1933 births
Living people
20th-century Norwegian historians
Academic staff of the University of Oslo
21st-century Norwegian historians